The Oldenburg Class T 0 (originally Class VIII) were goods train tank engines operated by the  Grand Duchy of Oldenburg State Railways. They were built specifically for branch lines, because four-coupled engines had proved uneconomical. Their wheelbase of 7.70 m enabled them to travel at up to 60 km/h. They were considerably more economical than the four-couplers. In 1885 four were built and two more followed in 1891.

See also
Grand Duchy of Oldenburg State Railways
List of Oldenburg locomotives and railbuses

Sources 
 

2-2-0 locomotives
T 0
Railway locomotives introduced in 1885
Standard gauge locomotives of Germany